The Kwara State Stadium is a multi-use stadium in Ilorin, Kwara, Nigeria.  It is currently used mostly for football matches and is the home stadium of Kwara United F.C. and ABS F.C.  The stadium has a capacity of 26,000   after renovation work that started in 2010. It is located on Stadium road , off Ibrahim Taiwo road.

External links
 Kwara State Executive Council approves upgrade of Stadium Complex

References 

Football venues in Nigeria
Kwara United F.C.
Ilorin